Doull is a surname that is sourced mainly to Scotland, England, and Ireland.. Doull is a variant of the Gaelic name MacDomhnall which means 'son of Donald'. Variants included Donnell, Donaldson and Doole.

People with the surname Doull
Alexander Doull (1870–1933), Anglican bishop
Bruce Doull (born 1950), former Australian rules football player
Doug Doull (born 1974), Canadian ice hockey player
James Doull (1918–2001), Canadian philosopher
John Doull (1878–1969), Canadian judge and politician
Judi Doull (born 1938), New Zealand cricketer
Lincoln Doull (born 1964), New Zealand cricketer
Owain Doull (born 1993), Welsh cyclist
Robert Doull (1828–1906), Canadian politician
Simon Doull (born 1969), New Zealand cricketer

Notes